Benjamin Luckwell (born 30 March 1966) is a British former cyclist. Luckwell competed in the team time trial at the 1988 Summer Olympics.

He represented England and won a bronze medal in the team time trial, at the 1990 Commonwealth Games in Auckland, New Zealand.

References

External links
 

1966 births
Living people
British male cyclists
Olympic cyclists of Great Britain
Cyclists at the 1988 Summer Olympics
Sportspeople from Gloucestershire
Commonwealth Games medallists in cycling
Commonwealth Games bronze medallists for England
Cyclists at the 1990 Commonwealth Games
Medallists at the 1990 Commonwealth Games